Club Deportivo Acero (often shortened to CDA or CD Acero, 'Steel Sporting Club' in Spanish) is a Spanish football team based in Puerto de Sagunto (an urban nucleus in Sagunto), in the Valencian Community, Spain. Founded in 1919 it plays in Tercera División RFEF – Group 6, holding home games at Estadio El Fornàs, which has a capacity of 4,500 spectators.

History
Football reached Sagunto city when the Basque sailors who docked at the commercial port played the game with the locals. In 1919 Sporting Club was founded, bringing the colors of the Athletic Club in honor of the steel company. In the early 1920s the club began to play against such popular teams, like Valencia CF or Levante UD, thus developing in a more professional way.

After the Spanish Civil War, the use of foreign idioms was forbidden, so the football team was renamed to Club Deportivo Acero.

Seasons

References

External links
Official website 
History of CD Acero (in Spanish)
Futbolme team profile 

Football clubs in the Valencian Community
Association football clubs established in 1919
1919 establishments in Spain
Sagunto